Mahonia bracteolata is a shrub in the  Berberidaceae described as a species in 1917. It is endemic to China, known from Sichuan and Yunnan Provinces.

References

bealei
Endemic flora of China
Plants described in 1917